El Dínamo is a Chilean online newspaper founded in 2010.

In late 2009, Sebastián Sichel ―then Sebastián Iglesias― presented the communicational project that would end up being El Dínamo. Later, the newspaper was supported by then christian democratic Juan José Santa Cruz, leader of the think tank Giro País.

History
After the defeat of the christian-democratic candidate Eduardo Frei Ruíz-Tagle against Sebastián Piñera (centre-right) in 2009 Chilean presidential election, Giro País decided, through its then executive director Sebastián Iglesias, to create a medium that promotes a «culture of the opposition in the current Concertación», because Giro País would be «a center of action more than of thought and we want it to put centre and liberal ideas capable of bringing to the new opposition the modernity, which was left behind in time». Thus, Ediciones Giro País SpA was officially created and was initially established by Mariana Aylwin, the lawyer Luis Alberto Aninat Urrejola and Juan José Santa Cruz, who later became the financier and campaign manager of Andrés Velasco, former Minister of Finance of Michelle Bachelet first government (2006–2010).

References

External links
 El Dínamo Official Web Site

2010 establishments in Chile
Chilean news websites
Internet properties established in 2010
Newspapers established in 2010
Spanish-language websites
Mass media in Santiago